Ninda is a locality in Victoria, Australia, located approximately 13 km from Sea Lake, Victoria.

Ninda Post Office opened on 2 November 1914 when the railway arrived and closed in 1958.

References

Towns in Victoria (Australia)